Manuel Ballester Boix (born in Barcelona on 27 June 1919; died 5 April 2005) was a Spanish chemist.

Biography
He received his degree at the University of Barcelona in 1944, his doctorate in Madrid, and finished his training at Harvard University in 1951. In 1944 he formed a team at the Spanish National Research Council. His work has largely been in kinetics and organic chemistry.

Awards
1982 - Prince of Asturias Award for Technical and Scientific Research

References

Organic chemists
Spanish chemists
Scientists from Catalonia
People from Barcelona
University of Barcelona alumni
Harvard University alumni
1919 births
2005 deaths
Spanish expatriates in the United States